Senator Dennis J. Patrick O'Grady (December 9, 1943 - March 29, 1972) was a Republican politician and is the youngest person elected to the Florida State Senate. He won his seat at age 23 in a court-ordered election on March 28, 1967, to represent the 15th District and served until 1968. He was born in Brooklyn, New York and had worked as a building contractor and nurseryman.

On March 29, 1972, O'Grady died in a car crash at the age of 28.

References

Republican Party Florida state senators
1943 births
1972 deaths
20th-century American politicians